The 2015 1. divisjon was the second tier of Norwegian women's football in 2015. The season kicked off on 18 April 2015, finishing on 8 November 2015.

The top placed team wase promoted to next year's Toppserien. The second placed team contested a playoff against the 11th placed team from the 2015 Toppserien for the right to play in Toppserien next season.

Table
 Urædd − promoted
 Grand Bodø
 Åsane
 Kongsvinger
 Lyn
 Byåsen
 Fart
 Øvrevoll Hosle
 Fortuna Ålesund
 Grei
 Haugar − relegated
 Sarpsborg 08 − relegated

References

Fotball.no

2015
2
Norway
Norway